Laila Finska-Bezerra (born 8 August 1968) is a Finnish former rower. She competed in the women's single sculls event at the 1996 Summer Olympics.

Personal life
Finska-Bezerra is married to Portuguese former rower Luis Bezerra. They live in Porto, Portugal.

References

External links
 

1968 births
Living people
Finnish female rowers
Olympic rowers of Finland
Rowers at the 1996 Summer Olympics
People from Maaninka
Finnish expatriates in Portugal
Sportspeople from North Savo
World Rowing Championships medalists for Finland
20th-century Finnish women